The College of the Holy Spirit of Tarlac (also referred to by its acronym CHST; colloquially, "Pirit") is a private, Catholic basic and higher education institution run by the Missionary Sisters Servants of the Holy Spirit in Tarlac, Philippines. It was established in 1939 as the Catholic Academy of Tarlac.

CHST has three buildings within Tarlac City—the primary, secondary, senior high school education departments are located in San Sebastian Village. It was originally an exclusive school for girls but in 2005, they started admitting male students which resulted to its growing population.

At present, the college has a Level 3 Accreditation Status awarded by the Philippine Accrediting Association of Schools, Colleges and Universities (PAASCU).

History
Founded by ten prominent men of Tarlac in 1939, the school was initially named as the Catholic Academy of Tarlac. In 1940, it was turned over to the Missionary Sisters Servants of the Holy Spirit (SSpS) and was later named Holy Ghost Institute and Holy Spirit Academy. The first college courses were offered in the academic year 1968. Eventually, it was renamed the College of the Holy Spirit of Tarlac.

All classes were held at its campus in Brgy. Mabini until April 1972. In July of the same year, due to its fast growing student population, a new building was constructed at the New Tarlac Heights Subdivision in San Sebastian Village for the College and High School Departments. The College Department occupied the entire building in F. Tañedo St. while another building in Brgy. San Sebastian was being constructed. Since then, the High School Department occupied the original building in San Sebastian.

SSpS was founded by Saint Arnold Janssen, a priest from Germany, as a religious-missionary community. He aimed to form a congregation of sisters who will serve as teachers to young girls, and to assist the missions of the priest.

See also
College of the Holy Spirit  of Manila
School of the Holy Spirit of BF Homes Quezon City
School of the Holy Spirit of Cubao Quezon City
Holy Spirit School of Tagbilaran
Holy Trinity Academy in Loay, Bohol,

Related links
 Society of the Divine Word
 Missionary Sisters Servants of the Holy Spirit
 Holy Spirit Adoration Sisters

References

External links

Official Facebook Page
Visit Tarlac: College of the Holy Spirit of Tarlac
College of the Holy Spirit Web Page
Servae Spiritus Sancti

Universities and colleges in Tarlac
Catholic universities and colleges in the Philippines
Catholic elementary schools in the Philippines
Catholic secondary schools in the Philippines
Education in Tarlac City
Educational institutions established in 1978
1978 establishments in the Philippines